Johann Nicolaus Bach (baptised February 5, 1653 in Erfurt, Germany) was the son of Johann(es) [Hans] Bach. He died of the plague in Erfurt, Germany, on July 30, 1682, at the age of 29. He was a Baroque musician and virtuoso Viola De Gamba player.

From 1673 until his death he was very active musician in his hometown of Erfurt. Bach was hired to play the Viol, or Viola De Gamba, an instrument he was said to be a prodigy on. It is unknown if he ever married or had children.

References 

Bach family
1653 births
1682 deaths
Musicians from Erfurt
